Sarah Mae Flemming Brown (June 28, 1933 – June 16, 1993) was an African-American woman who was expelled from a bus in Columbia, South Carolina, seventeen months before Rosa Parks refused to surrender her seat on an Alabama bus in 1955. Flemming's lawsuit against the bus company played an important role later in the Parks case.

Early life
Sarah Mae Flemming was born June 28, 1933 to Mack and Rosella Goodwin Flemming in Eastover, South Carolina. She grew up on the family's  farm and completed the tenth or eleventh grade at Webber High School in Eastover before leaving school to work. She spent a year working for an uncle in Ohio before returning to South Carolina, where she moved in with a cousin and began working two jobs as a domestic worker in Columbia, South Carolina.

Civil rights activism
On June 22, 1954, Flemming boarded a bus to go to work. She took the only empty seat, which she believed began the rows in which black riders were allowed to sit. The driver challenged her for sitting in a "white-only" section and because she was so humiliated, she signaled to get off at the next stop. The bus driver blocked her attempt to exit through the front of the bus and punched her in the stomach as he ordered her out the rear door.

Local civil rights activists heard of ordeal and enlisted attorney Phillip Wittenberg, a white attorney in Columbia, to represent her. Flemming v. South Carolina Electric and Gas  was filed on July 21, 1954, in U.S. District Court. The allegation was that Flemming's Fourteenth Amendment right to equal protection had been violated. On February 16, 1955, Federal District Judge George Bell Timmerman, Sr. dismissed the case. Ms. Flemming appealed to the Fourth Circuit Court of Appeals and her case was argued on June 21, 1955. The Fourth Circuit reversed Judge Timmerman on July 14, 1955, and remanded the case for further proceedings.

SCE&G appealed the decision of the Appeals Court. On April 23, 1956, the United States Supreme Court refused to review the 4th Circuit Court of Appeals decision and on June 13, 1956, Judge Timmerman dismissed the case once again. Mr. Wittenberg decided not to handle a second appeal and turned the case over to Thurgood Marshall and Robert Carter of the NAACP. For the third trial, Lincoln Jenkins, Jr. and Matthew J. Perry represented Ms. Flemming and the jury quickly found in the bus company's favor, but by that time the Montgomery bus boycott and the decision in Browder v. Gayle had been rendered, so a third appeal was not filed.

Later life
During her legal case, Sarah Mae Flemming married John Brown of Gaston County, North Carolina. The couple had three children.

Sarah Mae Flemming Brown died of a heart attack brought on by diabetes on June 16, 1993, just before her 60th birthday. She was buried in the Goodwill Baptist Church cemetery in Eastover, South Carolina.

In 2005, a documentary entitled Before Rosa: The Unsung Contribution Of Sarah Mae Flemming aired on PBS stations across the United States.

Further reading

References

                   

1933 births
1993 deaths
American civil rights activists
Deaths from diabetes
People from Eastover, South Carolina
African-American activists
Activists for African-American civil rights
20th-century African-American women
Women civil rights activists
American civil rights activists (civil rights movement)